Path quality analysis:  In a communications path, an analysis that (a) includes the overall evaluation of the component quality measures, the individual link quality measures, and the aggregate path quality measures, and (b) is performed by evaluating communications parameters, such as bit error ratio, signal-plus-noise-plus-distortion to noise-plus-distortion ratio, and spectral distortion.

References 

Radio frequency propagation